A substitute is a political candidate who is not directly elected, but who succeeds a politician holding an elected office after that person ceases to hold the office due to, for example, resignation or death. This system can be used to fill casual vacancies instead of holding by-elections or special elections to fill the vacant office. Substitutes are nominated, not at the time the vacancy arises but, rather, before the election for the information of voters. In voting systems which use electoral lists, the candidates on a given list who are not among those initially elected may become the substitutes for those who are. In other systems, individual candidates may have substitutes.

Belgium 
In Belgium, each electoral list has both a list of "effective" candidates and a list of "substitutes". The system was introduced as part of the law of 29 December 1899 introducing proportional representation. Before that, by-elections were held to succeed members.

France 
In the elections for the French National Assembly, each candidate nominates a substitute , who assumes the functions of the elected deputy if they die, enter the executive government, if the Government appoints them to an assignment of more than six months' duration, or if they are appointed to the Constitutional Council or Defender of Rights (Défenseur des droits).

If the deputy resigns, or their election is determined to be invalid, a by-election is held instead.

The Electoral Code does not provide for any age restriction to be appointed alternate. For the Fourteenth Legislature (2012 - 2017), the youngest Deputy-Substitute in France was Nicolas Brien, born in 1989, who was elected in Allier's 2nd constituency.

Examples 

2017
 Élise Fajgeles replaced Benjamin Griveaux when he was appointed Secretary of State to the Minister of the Economy and Finance on 22 July 2017. 
 Grégory Galbadon replaced Stéphane Travert when he was appointed Minister of Agriculture on 22 July 2017

2018
 Jean-Louis Thiériot replaced Yves Jégo in Seine-et-Marne's 3rd constituency.

2019
 Stéphanie Atger replaced Amélie de Montchalin when she was appointed Minister of Europe and Foreign Affairs.

2020
 Sandra Boëlle replaced Claude Goasguen in Paris's 14th constituency when he died.
Nicolas Meizonnet replaced Gilbert Collard in Gard's 2nd constituency when he was elected to the European Parliament.

2021
 Maud Gatel replaced Marielle de Sarnez in Paris's 11th constituency when she died

References

Politics
Elections